Amos Morris (born 1987/1988) is an Indigenous Australian country music bush balladeer from Kempsey, New South Wales. He won a Golden Guitar Award in 2008 for Bush Ballad of the Year, becoming the youngest ever winner of the category. He has performed with John Williamson and Warren H Williams in the song "Australia is Another Word for Free" which won a Golden Guitar Award for Bush Ballad of the Year in 2009.

Discography
 Memories Live On (2005) - One Stop Entertainment
 Sign of the Times (2007) - Nulla Records
 Life Goes On (2010)
 "By Request" (2012)

Awards

Country Music Awards of Australia
The Country Music Awards of Australia (CMAA) (also known as the Golden Guitar Awards) is an annual awards night held in January during the Tamworth Country Music Festival, celebrating recording excellence in the Australian country music industry. They have been held annually since 1973.

|-
| 2008
| "Sign of the Times" by Amos Morris
| Bush Ballad of the Year
| 
|-
| 2009
| "Australia Is Another Word for Free" by John Williamson, Warren H Williams & Amos Morris
| Bush Ballad of the Year
| 

 Note: wins only

References

External links
Amos Morris website

Australian country singers
Living people
People from the Mid North Coast
1980s births
21st-century Australian singers